The Embassy of France in Bucharest is the diplomatic mission of the French Republic in Romania.

Located at 13-15 Biserica Amzei Street, the building dates to 1889-1890. It is listed as a historic monument by Romania's Ministry of Culture and Religious Affairs.

See also 
 France–Romania relations

Notes

France
Bucharest
France–Romania relations
Historic monuments in Bucharest
Government buildings completed in 1890